Ron Foster is the name of:

Ron Foster (actor) (born 1930), American actor
Ron Foster (footballer) (1938–2017), English footballer
Ron Foster (musician)
Ronnie Foster (born 1950), American funk and soul-jazz organist
Ronald M. Foster (1896–1998), Bell Labs mathematician and filter researcher